Qōlyāqōl is a valley and a residential area in Afghanistan located in Qarabagh of Ghazni Province in the Hazaristan region of Afghanistan in central parts of the country.

Climate
Qolyaqol has a hot-summer humid continental climate (Köppen: Dsa) with dry summers and cold, snowy winters.

Population 
Qolyaqol residents are mostly Hazara people.

See also 
 Qarabagh District
 Ghazni Province

References 

Populated places in Ghazni Province
Ghazni Province
Valleys of Afghanistan
Hazarajat